Znicz Jarosław is a Polish basketball team, based in Jarosław, playing in Dominet Bank Ekstraliga.

Seasons 
 2008/2009
 Znicz Jarosław will play in Dominet Bank Ekstraliga
 2007/2008
 1st place in 1 liga
 2006/2007
 13th place in Dominet Bank Ekstraliga and relegation to 1 liga

Basketball teams in Poland
Sport in Podkarpackie Voivodeship
Jarosław